Thomas W. Swinney House, also known as The Swinney Homestead, is a historic home located at Fort Wayne, Indiana. It was built in 1844-1845 as a -story brick and limestone structure.  It was enlarged with a -story, square, Late Victorian style brick wing about 1885.  It features an Eastlake movement front porch.  It was built by Thomas  J. Swinney, a pioneer settler of Allen County and prominent Fort Wayne businessman.  The house and land for Swinney Park were passed to the city of Fort Wayne in 1922.

It was listed on the National Register of Historic Places in 1981.  It is located in the Fort Wayne Park and Boulevard System Historic District.

References

External links

Swinney Park

Historic American Buildings Survey in Indiana
Houses on the National Register of Historic Places in Indiana
Houses completed in 1845
Victorian architecture in Indiana
National Register of Historic Places in Fort Wayne, Indiana
Houses in Fort Wayne, Indiana
Historic district contributing properties in Indiana